Uspensky is a rural locality (a settlement) in Alexandrovskoye Rural Settlement, Talovsky District, Voronezh Oblast, Russia. The population was 160 as of 2010. There are 3 streets.

Geography 
Uspensky is located 13 km northwest of Talovaya (the district's administrative centre) by road. Novotroitsky is the nearest rural locality.

References 

Rural localities in Talovsky District